Seychelle Suzanne Gabriel is an American actress. On television, she portrayed Lourdes Delgado in Falling Skies (2011–2014) and voiced Asami Sato in The Legend of Korra (2012–2014). She has also appeared in the films The Spirit (2008), The Last Airbender (2010), Honey 2 (2011), Sleight (2016), and Blood Fest (2018).

Early life
Gabriel was raised in Burbank, California. Gabriel got into acting through her mother's involvement in casting extras for commercials and videos.

Career 
Gabriel appeared as Princess Yue in The Last Airbender (2010), directed by M. Night Shyamalan.  The film was based on the first season of Avatar: The Last Airbender.
Gabriel appeared in Honey 2 (2011), directed by Bille Woodruff, produced by Universal Studios Home Entertainment.
Gabriel also appeared in the films The Spirit (2008), as Young Sand Saref. She has performed on The Tonight Show, a late-night talk show, and had a recurring role on the comedy-drama television series Weeds. She has also appeared in one episode of Zoey 101. She was chosen as one of the 55 faces of the future by Nylon's Young Hollywood Issue in 2010.

It was announced on March 7, 2011, that Gabriel was to voice the character Asami Sato in the  Nickelodeon series The Legend of Korra.
Gabriel appeared as Lourdes, a series regular on the original TNT sci-fi action/drama series Falling Skies produced by Steven Spielberg 2011–2014. She also appeared in a 2014 music video by My Dear titled "Standing in This Dream".

Filmography

References

External links

Living people
21st-century American actresses
American child actresses
American film actresses
American television actresses
American voice actresses
Actresses from Burbank, California
Year of birth missing (living people)